Leonardo Santos Lisboa (born 1 June 1994), known as Léo Lisboa, is a Brazilian footballer who plays for Bangu Atlético Clube as a midfielder.

Club career
Born in Rio de Janeiro, Léo Lisboa graduated with Figueirense's youth setup. On 25 November 2012, he made his first team – and Série A – debut, coming on as a second-half substitute in a 2–3 home loss against Grêmio. He subsequently returned to the youth setup, being promoted to the main squad in 2014.

On 3 August 2014, Léo Lisboa scored his first professional goal, netting the first in a 3–0 home win against Sport.

Honours
Campeonato Catarinense: 2014

References

External links
Léo Lisboa at playmakerstats.com (English version of ogol.com.br)

1994 births
Living people
Footballers from Rio de Janeiro (city)
Brazilian footballers
Association football midfielders
Campeonato Brasileiro Série A players
Campeonato Brasileiro Série C players
Figueirense FC players
Tombense Futebol Clube players
Clube Náutico Marcílio Dias players
Resende Futebol Clube players
Bangu Atlético Clube players
Bonsucesso Futebol Clube players